Warkah (literally Letters) is a 2019 Malaysian Malay-language family drama film. It tells the story of a teenager who is caught between furthering his studies or helping out his family after an accident left his father paralysed. It is released on 15 August 2019 in Malaysia and Brunei.

Synopsis 
Ikmal, is a teenager and an excellent student in school. When his father, Kamil involves in an accident and is left paralysed, their family suddenly faces numerous challenges and financial problems. Ikmal is caught between his family situation and furthering his studies. Meanwhile, his teacher Ms Nur brings new hope to him.

The film includes the Malaysian Social Security Organization (SOCSO), and the film is based on an appreciation letter to SOSCO by a teenager.

Cast 
 Namron as Kamil
 Syazwan Zulkifly as Sufi
 Isyariana as Teacher Nur
 Wafiy as Ikmal
 Rayyana Rayqa as Hana

References

External links 
 Warkah on Cinema.com.my
 Warkah on Popcorn Malaysia

2019 drama films
Malay-language films